Anthony Mills was a cricketer.

Anthony or Tony Mills may also refer to:

Tony Mills (physician) (born 1961), American physician
Tony Mills (musician) (1962–2019), English rock singer

See also
Anthonies Mill, Missouri